Srebrna may refer to the following places:
Srebrna, Łódź Voivodeship (central Poland)
Srebrna, Płock County in Masovian Voivodeship (east-central Poland)
Srebrna, Podlaskie Voivodeship (north-east Poland)
Srebrna, Płońsk County in Masovian Voivodeship (east-central Poland)